Jacquie Joseph is an American former collegiate softball player who is the current head coach at Michigan State. Joseph played college softball at Central Michigan from 1982 to 1985.

Early life and education
Joseph attended school at Central Michigan and played softball for the school from 1982 to 1985. She graduated from Central Michigan in 1985 with a degree in business administration. She went back to Central Michigan and earned her master's degree in business in 1987.

Coaching career

Bowling Green
Joseph was hired in 1989 as Bowling Green's head softball coach. She won 37 games in the 1992 season at Bowling Green, the most in program history.

Michigan State
Joseph was hired by Michigan State in 1994 as head coach of the softball program. In 2016, Joseph was inducted into the National Fastpitch Coaches Association Hall of Fame as a contributor.

Personal life
Jacquie Joseph resides in Holt, Michigan and has one daughter named Emma.

Head coaching record

College

References

Living people
Softball players from Michigan
Female sports coaches
American softball coaches
Michigan State Spartans softball coaches
Sportspeople from Flint, Michigan
Central Michigan Chippewas softball players
Central Michigan Chippewas softball coaches
Indiana Hoosiers softball coaches
Bowling Green Falcons softball coaches
Year of birth missing (living people)